Georges Rol (22 May 1926 – 13 April 2017) was a Roman Catholic bishop.

Ordained to the priesthood in 1953, Rol served as coadjutor bishop of the Roman Catholic Diocese of Angoulême, France, from 1973 to 1975. He then served as bishop on the diocese from 1975 to 1993.

Notes

1926 births
2017 deaths
Bishops of Angoulême